Paretroplus maromandia is an endangered species of cichlid fish from fresh and brackish water in northwestern Madagascar, where known from the Maintsomalaza, Andranomalaza and Maevarano Rivers, and Lake Andrapongy. It has already been extirpated from the lake, and is threatened by habitat loss and invasive species. This relatively deep-bodied Paretroplus reaches  in length.

References

maromandia
Freshwater fish of Madagascar
Fish described in 1999
Taxonomy articles created by Polbot